Xizang Minzu University, also known as Tibet University for Nationalities, is a Chinese university established to educate ethnic minorities, specifically Tibetans.  It is under the jurisdiction of Tibet Autonomous Region, but is physically located in the city of Xianyang in Shaanxi province, near the provincial capital Xi'an.

History
Xizang Minzu University was established in 1958 as Tibet Public School.  It was the first university established by the government of Tibet Autonomous Region.  The university adopted its current name in 1965.

Overview
The university has over 9,400 full-time students, more than half of whom are members of ethnic minorities including Tibetans.  It has 1,105 faculty members.  The university offers 42 undergraduate majors and 20 master's programs.

Notable alumni
Basang, former Vice-Chairwoman of Tibet Autonomous Region
Losang Jamcan, Chairman of Tibet Autonomous Region
Tashi Tsering, educator
Wu Yingjie, Communist Party Secretary of the Tibet Autonomous Region

References

Universities and colleges in Shaanxi
Universities and colleges in Tibet
Educational institutions established in 1958
1958 establishments in China
Xianyang
Minzu Universities